Testosterone acetate/testosterone undecanoate/testosterone valerate (TA/TU/TV), sold under the brand name Deposterona, is an oil-based mixture of testosterone esters for depot intramuscular injection that is marketed in Mexico and is used in veterinary medicine. Its constituents include:

 Testosterone acetate (12 mg/mL)
 Testosterone undecanoate (12 mg/mL)
 Testosterone valerate (36 mg/mL)

Deposterona is described as essentially a low-dosed but longer-lasting alternative to Sustanon.

It is the only formulation of testosterone on the market that contains testosterone valerate.

See also
 List of combined sex-hormonal preparations § Androgens

References

Androgens and anabolic steroids
Androstanes
Combined androgen formulations
Prodrugs
Testosterone